Rixon James Wingrove (born 23 May 2000) is an Australian professional baseball first baseman for the Philadelphia Phillies organization.

Wingrove signed with the Phillies in 2018. He played in the Gulf Coast League in 2019 and was named an all-star. He did not play in 2020 because the minor league season was cancelled due to the COVID-19 pandemic. He played for the Clearwater Threshers in 2021, and batted .206 with 11 home runs and 100 strikeouts. In 2022, Wingrove played for the Jersey Shore Blue Claws. Wingrove also played for the Adelaide Giants of the Australian Baseball League.

Wingrove played for the Australian national baseball team in the 2023 World Baseball Classic. He had four runs batted in in Australia's win over China.

References

External links

Living people
2000 births
Sportspeople from Newcastle, New South Wales
Australian expatriate baseball players in the United States
Baseball first basemen
Florida Complex League Phillies players
Sydney Blue Sox players
Adelaide Giants players
Clearwater Threshers players
Jersey Shore BlueClaws players
2023 World Baseball Classic players